Sports Club Utexafrica, more commonly known as Utexafrica, is a Congolese football club based in Kinshasa.

History

Performance in CAF competitions
2002 CAF Cup: first round
The club have 1 appearance in CAF Cup

Current squad

Stadium
Currently the team plays at the Stade des Martyrs.

References

External links

Football clubs in the Democratic Republic of the Congo
Football clubs in Kinshasa
Sports clubs in the Democratic Republic of the Congo